The Complete Short Stories of J. G. Ballard is a collection of short stories by J. G. Ballard divided into two volumes:

The Complete Short Stories of J. G. Ballard: Volume 1
The Complete Short Stories of J. G. Ballard: Volume 2